Ram Pujan Patel was an Indian politician. He was elected to the Lok Sabha, lower house of the Parliament of India from Phulpur, Uttar Pradesh as member of the Janata Dal. He was Minister of State for Food and Civil Supplies in V. P. Singh ministry from 23 April 1990  to 10 November 1990. He was also Uttar Pradesh State Janata Dal president.

References

External links
 Official biographical sketch in Parliament of India website

India MPs 1984–1989
India MPs 1989–1991
India MPs 1991–1996
1940 births
Lok Sabha members from Uttar Pradesh
Janata Dal politicians
Living people
Indian National Congress politicians from Uttar Pradesh
People from Allahabad